Howard Klausner, known also as Howie Klausner, is an American filmmaker and writer, known for writing the script for the 2000 film Space Cowboys.

Filmography

As script writer
Weird Science (1997, for the episode "The Genie Detective")
Space Cowboys (2000)
Dirty Harry: The Original (2001, documentary short)
The Grace Card (2010, also producer)
The Last Ride (2011)
The Identical (2014)
Hoovey (2015, also producer)
Reagan (2023)

As director
Outlaw Dreams (2008, also script writer and producer)
The Secret Handshake (2015, also writer and producer)

References

External links
 

Year of birth missing (living people)
Living people
American filmmakers